Ansell's shrew (Crocidura ansellorum) is a species of mammal in the family Soricidae. It is endemic to Zambia.  Its natural habitat is subtropical or tropical moist lowland forests. It is threatened by habitat loss.

References

Ansell's shrew
Endemic fauna of Zambia
Mammals of Zambia
Fauna of Southern Africa
Endangered animals
Endangered biota of Africa
Ansell's shrew
Taxonomy articles created by Polbot
Central Zambezian miombo woodlands